Judge Walker may refer to:

John M. Walker Jr. (born 1940), judge of the United States Court of Appeals for the Second Circuit
Jonathan Hoge Walker (1754–1824), judge of the United States District Court for the Western District of Pennsylvania
Justin R. Walker (born 1982), judge of the U.S. Court of Appeals for the District of Columbia Circuit
Lance E. Walker (born 1972), judge of the United States District Court for the District of Maine
Linda T. Walker (born 1960), federal magistrate judge of the United States District Court for the Northern District of Georgia
Mark E. Walker (born 1967), judge of the United States District Court for the Northern District of Florida
Richard Wilde Walker Jr. (1857–1936), judge of the United States Court of Appeals for the Fifth Circuit
Thomas Glynn Walker (1899–1993), judge of the United States District Court for the District of New Jersey
Thomas Joseph Walker (1877–1945), judge of the United States Customs Court
Vaughn Walker (born 1944), judge of the United States District Court for the Northern District of California

See also
Justice Walker (disambiguation)